XHBO-FM is a radio station on 105.5 FM in Irapuato, Guanajuato. XHBO is owned by Grupo Radiorama and carries its Fiesta Mexicana grupera format.

History

XEBO-AM received its concession on January 16, 1937, broadcasting with 600 watts on 1330 kHz. By the 1960s it was operating with 1,000 watts, and ultimately in the 1990s it changed to 5,000.

In October 2011, a strike began at XEBO over unpaid salaries, impeding its AM-FM migration and shutting the station down for two years. On December 12, 2013, XEBO's employees signed an agreement to sell the station to Radiorama. When XEBO returned to the air, it had carried out its AM-FM migration and become XHBO-FM 105.5.

For some time until 2015, XEBO/XHBO's transmitter was located in San José de la Sonaja, to the south of town. It was relocated to Irapuato that year. In 2016, the successors of Alfonso Martínez Vela transferred the station to a new concessionaire.

In March 2018, XHBO-FM was taken over by Multimedios Radio as part of MM beginning operations of the Radiorama Bajío cluster in León. Multimedios immediately replaced the @FM pop format, owned by Radiorama, with its La Lupe format of grupera music from the 80s and 90s.

The change was undone when Multimedios stopped leasing several stations from Radiorama on August 1, 2020.

References

Spanish-language radio stations
Radio stations in Guanajuato
Radio stations established in 1937